The Spaceship is a science fiction comedy set in the year 2104 and onwards that premiered on BBC Radio 7 over the course of five days during the last week of June 2005. It was written by Paul Barnhill and Neil Warhurst and was directed by Sally Avens.

A second series of The Spaceship began broadcasting on 25 February 2008, with the first series repeated again in the week prior to broadcast. In this series the Really Invincible was upgraded to version 3.2.8.

In the year 2104 a fleet of research cruisers were launched into space. Their mission: to seek out new life. With every moment on board preserved by wall-to-wall monitoring and transmitted over time back to Earth, we’ve been allowed access to one of these ships: The Really Invincible III, Macclesfield Division. What you are about to hear took place, live, four years ago, seventy thousand light years from home.

Characters
Captain Gordon "Flashdance" Taylor (James Fleet) – Gordon is captain of The Really Invincible III and has a tendency to throw cheese and wine parties at a moments notice.
Melissa Paterson (Emily Joyce) – Despite being the ship's security officer, Melissa never wears the regulation uniform. 
Karen Trex (Rosie Cavaliero) – Ship's Communications Officer, Feng Shui expert, and all-round nice person. 
Stuart Jackson (Paul Barnhill) – Stuart is the ship's engineer and newest member after the last engineer was accidentally ejected into space.
Clive 55 (Neil Warhurst) – As one of 137 clones, all called Clive, created in a lab just outside Warrington, he is the ship's Chief Medical Scientist.
Narrator (Nick Bolton) – Guide to events on board The Really Invincible III.
E3007 Series II Yakamoto – The ship's robot that has been malfunctioning since launch and is locked in a perpetual loop of swing music. Its only current use is that of an iron for the crew's clothes.

Episode guide

The Spaceship
Episode 3002: Lost – The crew is responsible for taking care of the princess of the Urg.
Episode 3003: Indestructible – Why does The Indestructible III explode for no reason?
Episode 3004: Monster – Who or what is in the hold of The Really Invincible III.
Episode 3005: Dirty – Clive 55’s experiment with dark matter goes awry.
Episode 3205: Enemies – The crew prepare to meet the Duhwop-eye.

The Spaceship II (Second Series)
Episode 1: Hole – While dealing with the unpleasant consequences of the first ever incident of travel through a black hole, the crew faces a race of call-centre operative plants.
Episode 2: Manhood – Scientist Clive 55 reconstructs a dead space pirate and before long he's running the ship.
Episode 3: Rude – The crew have some space tourists on board, but it turns into a holiday from hell. 
Episode 4: Sick – The crew contract a mystery virus which makes them age at an alarming rate.
Episode 5: The End – The End: The crew find themselves at the end of the universe.

External links
The Spaceship section at Nebulous City (via Wayback Machine).
British Comedy Guide

BBC Radio comedy programmes
Science fiction comedy
Works set in the 22nd century
British science fiction radio programmes
Fiction set in the 22nd century
BBC Radio 7 (rebranded) programmes